Master Corporal Collin Ryan Fitzgerald, MMV is a Canadian soldier who was among the first recipients of the Medal of Military Valour, a Canadian military decoration, in recognition of actions under enemy fire in Afghanistan. He belonged to Princess Patricia's Canadian Light Infantry.

The citation reads:

References

Year of birth missing (living people)
Living people
Canadian Army soldiers
Canadian military personnel of the War in Afghanistan (2001–2021)
Recipients of the Medal of Military Valour